Barbara Halina Bartuś (née Gurbisz; born 3 July 1967) is a Polish politician from Law and Justice. She has sat in the Sejm since 2007.

Early life 
Bartuś was born in Gorlice.

Personal life 
She is married (husband Adam Bartuś) and has two daughters: Anna and Beata.

References 

1967 births
Living people
Members of the Polish Sejm 2007–2011
Members of the Polish Sejm 2011–2015
Members of the Polish Sejm 2015–2019
Members of the Polish Sejm 2019–2023
Maria Curie-Skłodowska University alumni
21st-century Polish politicians
21st-century Polish women politicians
Women members of the Sejm of the Republic of Poland
People from Gorlice